Jamil Nasir is an American science fiction and fantasy author born in Chicago, Illinois, United States.

He has won a Grand Prix de l'Imaginaire for foreign novel and received a special citation from the Philip K. Dick Award.

Novels 
Quasar (1995)
The Higher Space (1996)
Tower of Dreams (1999)
Distance Haze (2000)
The Houses of Time (2007)
Tunnel Out of Death (2013)

External links

Living people
American science fiction writers
American male novelists
Year of birth missing (living people)